Rafael Addison (born July 22, 1964) is a retired American professional basketball player who played in the National Basketball Association (NBA) and other leagues. He was listed at 6'7" and 215 lbs.

Addison attended Syracuse University and was drafted in the second round of the 1986 NBA Draft by the Phoenix Suns.

He has played professionally in Italy for Allibert Livorno (1987–1991, Serie A2 in 1989–91, also known as Garessio 2000 Livorno and Tombolini Livorno) and Benetton Treviso (1993–94, won the Italian Cup).

NBA career statistics

Regular season 

|-
| align="left" | 1986–87
| align="left" | Phoenix
| 62 || 12 || 11.5 || .441 || .320 || .797 || 1.7 || .7 || .4 || .1 || 5.8
|-
| align="left" | 1991–92
| align="left" | New Jersey
| 76 || 8 || 15.5 || .433 || .286 || .737 || 2.2 || .9 || .4 || .4 || 5.8
|-
| align="left" | 1992–93
| align="left" | New Jersey
| 68 || 15 || 17.1 || .443 || .206 || .814 || 1.9 || .8 || .3 || .2 || 6.3
|-
| align="left" | 1994–95
| align="left" | Detroit
| 79 || 16 || 22.5 || .476 || .289 || .747 || 3.1 || 1.4 || .7 || .3 || 8.3
|-
| align="left" | 1995–96
| align="left" | Charlotte
| 53 || 0 || 9.7 || .467 || .000 || .773 || 1.3 || .6 || .2 || .2 || 3.2 
|-
| align="left" | 1996–97
| align="left" | Charlotte
| 41 || 3 || 8.7 || .402 || .400 || .786 || 1.1 || .8 || .2 || .1 || 3.1 
|-
| align="left" | Career
| align="left" | 
| 379 || 54 || 15.0 || .449 || .282 || .772 || 2.1 || .9 || .4 || .2 || 5.8
|}

Playoffs 

|-
| align="left" | 1991–92
| align="left" | New Jersey
| 1 || 0 || 9.0 || .286 || .500 || – || .0 || 1.0 || .0 || .0 || 5.0
|-
| align="left" | 1992–93
| align="left" | New Jersey
| 5 || 0 || 10.6 || .333 || – || 1.000 || 1.2 || 1.0 || .6 || .0 || 3.4 
|-
| align="left" | Career
| align="left" | 
| 6 || 0 || 10.3 || .321 || .500 || 1.000 || 1.0 || 1.0 || .5 || .0 || 3.7
|}

External links 
College & NBA stats @ basketballreference.com
Player Profile @ orangehoops.org
Italian League profile

1964 births
Living people
American expatriate basketball people in Greece
American expatriate basketball people in Italy
American men's basketball players
Basketball players from Jersey City, New Jersey
Charlotte Hornets players
Detroit Pistons players
Henry Snyder High School alumni
New Jersey Nets players
Pallacanestro Treviso players
P.A.O.K. BC players
Phoenix Suns draft picks
Phoenix Suns players
Shooting guards
Small forwards
Syracuse Orange men's basketball players